The Dibër County in northeastern Albania is subdivided into 4 municipalities. These municipalities contain 285 towns and villages:

Rremulli

*Rukaj 

*Samaj 

*Sparrip 

*Grop 

*Pujk

References